James W. Huffman (1894–1980) was a U.S. Senator from Ohio from 1945 until 1946. Senator Huffman may also refer to:

Bill Huffman (born 1924), Michigan State Senate
Charles Solomon Huffman (1865–1960), Kansas State Senate
Joan Huffman (born 1956), Texas State Senate
Matt Huffman (born 1960), Ohio State Senate